Good Samaritan Regional Medical Center is a 188-bed teaching hospital located in Corvallis, Oregon, United States.  Founded in 1922, it is the only hospital in the city. The hospital operates a level II trauma center, and serves the Linn, Benton, and Lincoln County area. The hospital operates a number of residency training and fellowship programs for newly graduated physicians, psychologists, and pharmacists.

The hospital serves as the hub for the operations of Samaritan Health Services. It is accredited by the Joint Commission on Accreditation of Healthcare Organizations.

History 
Started as Corvallis General Hospital, the original facility was located on Northwest Harrison Boulevard. After World War II the hospital was on the brink of bankruptcy, unable to pay off its bonds. In an effort to retire the debt the hospital was put under the auspices of the Episcopal Diocese of Oregon.

In 1948, Corvallis General was reconstituted as a nonprofit organization and renamed Good Samaritan Hospital. In 1975, the hospital moved to its current location north of the city overlooking Oregon Route 99W. The hospital has maintained its affiliation with the Episcopal Diocese of Oregon and has continued to thrive. Now known as Good Samaritan Regional Medical Center, today it is the flagship institution of Samaritan Health Services. The original hospital building on Harrison was demolished in 2011.

In 2020, the hospital treated patients for COVID-19 infection, as the global pandemic developed.

Operations
The medical center has 188 licensed beds, but only has 165 available, and is the only hospital in Benton County. Services at the facility include maternity, surgery, radiology, heart and vascular services, pediatrics, mental health, an intensive care unit, oncology, laboratory services, neurology, dialysis, and emergency services, among others. It is accredited by the Joint Commission on Accreditation of Health Care Organizations (JCAHO).

The acute care facility is a level two trauma center and serves the entire county, plus portions of neighboring counties. For 2012, the hospital had a total of 9,340 discharges, with 40,281 patient days, 4,095 surgeries, 1,073 births, and 18,658 emergency department visits. That year it had $618 million in charges, provided $20.5 million in charity care, and had an operating loss of $3 million.

Graduate medical education
Good Samaritan Regional Medical Center operates a number of residency training and fellowship programs for newly graduated physicians. The residencies train physicians specializing in: dermatology, family medicine, internal medicine, psychiatry, child and adolescent psychiatry, general surgery, orthopedic surgery, and cardiology. In addition to medical education, the hospital also runs residency training programs in psychology, pharmacy, and sports physical therapy. The physical therapy program is accredited by the American Board of Physical Therapy Residency and Fellowship Education.

See also
 List of hospitals in Oregon

References

Hospital buildings completed in 1975
Hospitals in Oregon
Buildings and structures in Corvallis, Oregon
1922 establishments in Oregon
Hospitals established in 1922
Samaritan Health Services